Hilton, Angus, may refer to two villages in Scotland:
Hilton (Lintrathen), Angus, Bridgend of Lintrathen
Hilton (Inverkeilor), Angus, Inverkeilor